Lisa Negri (born Elisa Biondi, São Paulo, July 11, 1941 – died December 19, 2014) was a Brazilian actress. Among her main acting roles on Brazilian television are the soap operas Quem Casa com Maria? (1964), Teresa (1965), Os Ossos do Barão (1973) and As Pupilas do Senhor Reitor (1995) on television, and A Virgem e o Machão (1974), Dezenove Mulheres e Um Homem (1977), Pintando o Sexo (1977) and Os Boiadeiros (1979) in the movies.

References

External links

1941 births
2014 deaths
Brazilian film actresses
Brazilian television actresses
Actresses from São Paulo
Brazilian telenovela actresses
20th-century Brazilian actresses